Elections to Rochdale Council were held on 6 May 1999.  One third of the council was up for election and the Labour Party kept overall control of the council.

After the election, the composition of the council was:
Labour 35
Liberal Democrat 19
Conservative 6

Election result

External links
BBC report of 1999 Rochdale election result

1999 English local elections
1999
1990s in Greater Manchester